Konstanty Józef Zieliński (born in 1646 in Rostkowo; died on 17 February 1709 in Moscow) - Polish Roman Catholic priest, auxiliary bishop of Gniezno in the years 1694–1700, metropolitan archbishop of Lviv in the years 1700–1709.

He was born in January 1646. The exact date, however, is unknown. He came from a wealthy noble family from northern Mazovia, using the Świnka coat of arms. His family owned numerous lands in the Dobrzyń region and in Płock Province. He was the son of the castellan of Sierpc,  (1619–1678) and his first wife, Helena née Zawadzka (1626–1648). He studied in Kraków, Ingolstadt, Paris and Rome. He obtained a doctorate in theology. He was ordained a priest in 1671.

Notes

References

1646 births
1709 deaths
Archbishops of Lviv
17th-century Polish nobility
18th-century Polish nobility